Amadeus is a 1984 American period biographical drama film directed by Miloš Forman and adapted by Peter Shaffer from his 1979 stage play Amadeus. Set in Vienna, Austria, during the latter half of the 18th century, the film is a fictionalized story of Wolfgang Amadeus Mozart from the time he left Salzburg, described by its writer as a "fantasia on the theme of Mozart and Salieri". Mozart's music is heard extensively in the soundtrack. The film follows a fictional rivalry between Mozart and Italian composer Antonio Salieri at the court of Emperor Joseph II. The film stars F. Murray Abraham as Salieri and Tom Hulce as Mozart. Abraham and Hulce were both nominated for the Academy Award for Best Actor, with Abraham winning.

Amadeus was released by Orion Pictures on September 19, 1984, thirteen days following its world premiere in Los Angeles on September 6, 1984. Upon release, it received widespread acclaim and was a box office hit, grossing over $90 million. Considered by many to be one of the greatest films of all time, Amadeus was nominated for 53 awards and received 40, including eight Academy Awards (including the Academy Award for Best Picture), four BAFTA Awards, four Golden Globe Awards, and a Directors Guild of America award. , it was the most recent film to have more than one nomination in the Academy Award for Best Actor category. In 1998, the American Film Institute ranked it 53rd on its 100 Years... 100 Movies list. In 2019, the film was selected for preservation in the United States National Film Registry by the Library of Congress as being "culturally, historically, or aesthetically significant".

Plot
In the winter of 1823, Antonio Salieri is committed to a psychiatric hospital after a suicide attempt, during which his servants overhear him confess to murdering Wolfgang Amadeus Mozart. The young priest Father Vogler approaches Salieri for elaboration on Salieri's confession. Salieri recounts how, even in his youth in the 1760s, he desired to be a composer, much to his father's chagrin. He prays to God that if He makes Salieri a famous composer, he will, in return, promise his faithfulness. Soon after, his father dies, which Salieri takes as a sign that God has accepted his vow. By 1774, Salieri has become court composer to Emperor Joseph II in Vienna. Seven years later, at a reception in honor of Mozart's patron, the Prince-Archbishop of Salzburg, Salieri is shocked to discover that the transcendentally talented Mozart is obscene and immature. Salieri, a devout Catholic, cannot fathom why God would endow such a great gift to Mozart instead of him and concludes that God is using Mozart's talent to mock Salieri's mediocrity. Salieri renounces God and vows to take revenge on Him by destroying Mozart.

Mozart's alcoholism deteriorates his health, marriage, and reputation at court, even as he continues to produce brilliant work. Salieri hires a young girl to pose as Mozart's maid and discovers that Mozart is working on an opera based on the play The Marriage of Figaro, which the Emperor has forbidden. When Mozart is summoned to court to explain, he manages to convince the Emperor to allow his opera to premiere, despite Salieri and the advisers' attempts at sabotage. When Mozart is informed that his father has died, he writes Don Giovanni in his grief. Salieri recognizes the dead commander in the opera as symbolic of Mozart's father and concocts a scheme; he leads Mozart to believe that his father has risen to commission a Requiem. He then plans to kill Mozart once the piece is finished and premiere it at Mozart's funeral, claiming the work as his own. Meanwhile, Mozart's friend Emanuel Schikaneder invites him to write an opera for his theatre. Mozart obliges despite his wife Constanze's insistence that he finish the Requiem, as the opera is a riskier venture financially. After arguing with Mozart, Constanze leaves with their young son, Karl.

The opera in question, The Magic Flute, is a great success, but the overworked Mozart collapses during one performance. Salieri takes him home and persuades him to continue the Requiem, offering to take the bedridden Mozart's dictation; the two lay down the opening of the Confutatis together. The next morning, Mozart thanks Salieri for his friendship, and Salieri admits that Mozart is the greatest composer he knows. Constanze returns and demands that Salieri leave immediately. In her guilt, she locks the unfinished Requiem away in a cabinet, keeping it away from both composers; as she and Salieri argue, Mozart dies from exhaustion. Mozart is taken out of the city and unceremoniously buried in a mass grave.

Back in 1823, Vogler is too shocked to absolve Salieri, who surmises that the "merciful" God preferred to destroy His beloved Mozart rather than allow Salieri to share in the smallest part of his glory. Salieri promises, with bitter irony, to both pray for and absolve Vogler along with all of the world's mediocrities as their "patron saint". As Salieri is wheeled down a hallway, absolving the hospital's patients of their own inadequacies as he passes by, Mozart's laughter rings in the air.

Cast

Production
Kenneth Branagh writes in his autobiography Beginning that he was one of the finalists for the role of Mozart, but was dropped from consideration when Forman decided to make the film with an American cast.

Mark Hamill, who replaced Tim Curry as Mozart towards the end of the stage play's Broadway run, read with many actresses auditioning for the part of Mozart's wife Constanze.  However, Forman ultimately decided not to cast him due to his association with the character of Luke Skywalker, feeling that audiences would not believe him as the composer. Tom Hulce reportedly used John McEnroe's mood swings as a source of inspiration for his portrayal of Mozart's unpredictable genius.

Meg Tilly was cast as Mozart's wife Constanze, but she tore a ligament in her leg the day before shooting started. She was replaced by Elizabeth Berridge. Simon Callow, who played Mozart in the original London stage production of Amadeus, was cast as Emanuel Schikaneder, the librettist of The Magic Flute.

The film was shot on location in Prague and Kroměříž. Notably, Forman was able to shoot scenes in the Count Nostitz Theatre in Prague, where Don Giovanni and La clemenza di Tito debuted two centuries before. Several other scenes were shot at the Barrandov Studios and Invalidovna building, former "hôtel des invalides", built in 1731–1737.

Forman collaborated with American choreographer Twyla Tharp.

Reception

Critical reception
Amadeus holds a score of 89% on review aggregator Rotten Tomatoes based on 151 reviews, with an average rating of 8.9/10. The site's consensus states: "Amadeus liberties with history may rankle some, but the creative marriage of Miloš Forman and Peter Shaffer yields a divinely diabolical myth of genius and mediocrity, buoyed by inspired casting and Mozart's rapturous music." Giving the film four out of four stars, Roger Ebert acknowledged that it was one of the "riskiest gambles a filmmaker has taken in a long time," but added "(here is the genius of the movie) there is nothing cheap or unworthy about the approach," and ultimately concluded that it was a "magnificent film, full and tender and funny and charming". Ebert later added the film to his Great Movies list. Peter Travers of People magazine said that "Hulce and Abraham share a dual triumph in a film that stands as a provocative and prodigious achievement." Stanley Kauffmann of The New Republic put it on his list of films worth seeing. In one negative review, Todd McCarthy of Variety said that despite "great material and themes to work with, and such top talent involved," the "stature and power the work possessed onstage have been noticeably diminished" in the film adaptation. The film's many historical inaccuracies have attracted criticism from music historians.

Box office
The film grossed $52 million in the United States and Canada and by November 1985, while still in theaters overseas, had grossed over $90 million worldwide to date.

Accolades
The film was nominated for eleven Academy Awards, winning eight (including Best Picture). At the end of the Oscar ceremony, Laurence Olivier came on stage to present the Oscar for Best Picture. As Olivier thanked the academy for inviting him, he was already opening the envelope. Instead of announcing the nominees, he simply read, "The winner for this is Amadeus." An AMPAS official quickly went onstage to confirm the winner and signaled that all was well, before Olivier then presented the award to producer Saul Zaentz. Olivier (in his 78th year) had been ill for many years, and it was because of mild dementia that he forgot to read the nominees. Zaentz then thanked Olivier, saying it was an honour to receive the award from him, before mentioning the other nominees in his acceptance speech: The Killing Fields, A Passage to India, Places in the Heart and A Soldier's Story. Maurice Jarre won the Oscar for Best Original Music Score for his scoring of A Passage to India. In his acceptance speech for the award, Jarre remarked "I was lucky Mozart was not eligible this year".

The film along with The English Patient, The Hurt Locker, The Artist, and Birdman are the only Best Picture winners never to enter the weekend box office top 5 after rankings began being recorded in 1982. The film peaked at No. 6 during its 8th weekend in theaters. Saul Zaentz produced both Amadeus and The English Patient.

Historicity
From the beginning, writer Peter Shaffer and director Miloš Forman both were open about their desire to create entertaining drama only loosely based on reality, calling the work a "fantasia on the theme of Mozart and Salieri".

The idea of animosity between Mozart and Salieri was popularized by Alexander Pushkin in 1830 in his play Mozart and Salieri. In it, Salieri actually murders Mozart on stage. The play was made into the opera Mozart and Salieri by Nikolai Rimsky-Korsakov 67 years later, which in turn had its first screen adaptation by silent-film director Victor Tourjansky in 1914.

Another significant departure in the film is the portrayal of Salieri as a pious loner trapped in a vow of chastity, when in reality he was a married family man with eight children and at least one mistress.

Mozart was indeed commissioned to compose a Requiem Mass by an anonymous benefactor. In reality, the patron turned out to be Count Franz von Walsegg, who was grieving after the death of his wife.

Alternative version
Amadeus premiered in 1984 as a PG-rated movie with a running time of 161 minutes. Director Miloš Forman introduced an R-rated version with nearly 20 minutes of restored footage. This version was released by the studios as a Director's Cut on September 24, 2002. Forman justified why those scenes were cut in the first place in the 1995 supplemental material for Pioneer's deluxe LaserDisc. However, he explained why the scenes were eventually restored in a subsequent 2002 interview with The A.V. Club:

Music

Film credits
 Music conducted and supervised by Neville Marriner
 Music coordinator: John Strauss
 Orchestra: Academy of St Martin in the Fields, conducted by Neville Marriner
 Choruses
 Academy Chorus of St Martin in the Fields, conducted by László Heltay
 Ambrosian Opera Chorus, conducted by John McCarthy
 The Choristers of Westminster Abbey, conducted by Simon Preston
 Instrumental soloists
 Piano Concerto No. 22 in E-flat major, K. 482: Ivan Moravec
 Piano Concerto No. 20 in D minor, K. 466: Imogen Cooper
 Adagio in C minor for Glass Harmonica, K. 617: Thomas Bloch with The Brussels Virtuosi, conducted by Marc Grauwels
 Parody backgrounds: San Francisco Symphony Chorus
 "Caro mio ben" by Giuseppe Giordani: Michele Esposito, soprano

Original soundtrack recording
The soundtrack album reached No. 1 in the Billboard Classical Albums Chart, No. 56 in the Billboard Popular Albums Chart, has sold over 6.5 million copies and received thirteen gold discs, making it one of the most popular classical music recordings of all time. It won the Grammy Award for Best Classical Album in 1984.
 Disc 1
 Mozart: Symphony No. 25 in G minor, K. 183, 1st movement
 Giovanni Battista Pergolesi: Stabat Mater: "Quando corpus morietur" and "Amen"
 Early 18th Century Gypsy Music: Bubak and Hungaricus
 Mozart: Serenade for Winds in B-flat major, K. 361, 3rd movement
 Mozart: The Abduction from the Seraglio, K. 384, Turkish Finale
 Mozart: Symphony No. 29 in A major, K. 201, 1st movement
 Mozart: Concerto for Two Pianos in E-flat major, K. 365, 3rd movement
 Mozart: Great Mass in C minor, K. 427, Kyrie
 Mozart: Symphonie Concertante in E-flat major, K. 364, 1st movement
 Mozart: Piano Concerto No. 15 in B-Flat, K. 450, 3rd movement
 Disc 2
 Mozart: Piano Concerto No. 22 in E-flat major, K. 482, 3rd movement
 Mozart: The Marriage of Figaro, K. 492, Act III, "Ecco la marcia"
 Mozart: The Marriage of Figaro, K. 492, Act IV, "Ah, tutti contenti"
 Mozart: Don Giovanni, K. 527, Act II, Commendatore scene
 Mozart: Zaide, K. 344, Aria, "Ruhe sanft"
 Mozart: Requiem, K. 626, Introitus (orchestral introduction)
 Mozart: Requiem, K. 626, Dies irae
 Mozart: Requiem, K. 626, Rex tremendae majestatis
 Mozart: Requiem, K. 626, Confutatis
 Mozart: Requiem, K. 626, Lacrimosa
 Mozart: Piano Concerto No. 20 in D minor, K. 466, 2nd movement

All tracks on the album were performed specifically for the film. According to the film commentary by Forman and Schaffer, Marriner agreed to score the film if Mozart's music was completely unchanged from the original scores. Marriner did add some notes to Salieri's music that are noticeable in the beginning of the film, as Salieri begins his confession.

The aria "Ruhe sanft" from the opera Zaide does not appear in the film.

Charts

Weekly charts

Year-end charts

More Music from the Original Soundtrack
In 1985 an additional album with the title More Music from the Original Soundtrack of the Film Amadeus was issued containing further selections of music that were not included on the original soundtrack release.
 Mozart: The Magic Flute, K. 620, Overture
 Mozart: The Magic Flute, K. 620, act 2, Queen of the Night aria
 Mozart: Masonic Funeral Music, K. 477
 Mozart: Piano Concerto No. 20 in D minor, K. 466, 1st movement
 Antonio Salieri: Axur, re d'Ormus, Finale
 Mozart: Eine kleine Nachtmusik (Serenade No. 13 for Strings in G major), K. 525, 1st movement, arranged for woodwind octet by Graham Sheen
 Mozart: Concerto for Flute and Harp in C major, K. 299, 2nd movement
 Mozart: Six German Dances (Nos. 1–3), K. 509
 Giuseppe Giordani: "Caro mio ben"
 Mozart: The Abduction from the Seraglio, K. 384, Chorus of the Janissaries (Arr.) and "Ich möchte wohl der Kaiser sein" ("Ein deutsches Kriegslied"), K. 539 (Arr.)

The Masonic Funeral Music was originally intended to play over the closing credits, but was replaced in the film by the second movement of the Piano Concerto No. 20 in D minor (included on the Original Soundtrack Recording).

Director's Cut soundtrack
In 2002, to coincide with the release of the Director's Cut of the film, the soundtrack was remastered with 24-bit encoding and reissued with the title Special Edition: The Director's Cut – Newly Remastered Original Soundtrack Recording on two 24-karat gold CDs. It contains most of the music from the previous two releases, but with the following differences.

The following pieces were added for this release:
 Salieri's March of Welcome turned into "Non più andrai" from The Marriage of Figaro (includes dialogue from the film)
 Adagio in C minor for Glass Harmonica, K. 617 (from a new 2001 recording)
The following pieces, previously released on More Music from the Original Soundtrack of the Film Amadeus, were not included:
 Masonic Funeral Music, K. 477
 Six German Dances (Nos. 1–3), K. 509

Notes

References

External links

 
 
 
 
 
 Analysis of Amadeus – the play and the film
 Amadeus script

1984 films
1980s English-language films
1984 drama films
American drama films
BAFTA winners (films)
Best Drama Picture Golden Globe winners
Best Foreign Film César Award winners
Best Picture Academy Award winners
Fiction with unreliable narrators
Films about classical music and musicians
Films about composers
Films based on plays by Peter Shaffer
Films directed by Miloš Forman
Films featuring a Best Actor Academy Award-winning performance
Films featuring a Best Drama Actor Golden Globe winning performance
Films produced by Saul Zaentz
Films set in 1774
Films set in the 1780s
Films set in the 1790s
Films set in 1823
Films set in Vienna
Films shot in Vienna
Films that won the Academy Award for Best Makeup
Films that won the Best Costume Design Academy Award
Films that won the Best Sound Mixing Academy Award
Films whose art director won the Best Art Direction Academy Award
Films whose director won the Best Directing Academy Award
Films whose director won the Best Director Golden Globe
Films whose writer won the Best Adapted Screenplay Academy Award
Films about Wolfgang Amadeus Mozart
Cultural depictions of Antonio Salieri
Cultural depictions of Joseph II, Holy Roman Emperor
Films shot in Prague
United States National Film Registry films
1980s American films